The 1999 World Rally Championship was the 27th season of the FIA World Rally Championship. The season consisted of 14 rallies. Tommi Mäkinen won his fourth drivers' world championship driving for Mitsubishi, ahead of Richard Burns and Didier Auriol. The manufacturers' title was won by Toyota, ahead of Subaru and Mitsubishi.

In an upset predicted two years earlier a two-wheel-drive car won a rally for the first time since Alain Oreille won the 1989 Rallye Côte d'Ivoire in his Renault 5 when Philippe Bugalski took his Citroën Xsara Kit Car to victory in the Rally Catalunya. Bugalski backed it up three weeks later winning the Tour de Corse. With such specialised tarmac cars now beating WRC cars while at the same time not competing in the FIA 2-Litre World Rally Cup designed for them a revamp of two-wheel-drive regulations was created for the 2000 season.

Calendar

The 1999 championship was contested over fourteen rounds in Europe, Africa, Asia, South America and Oceania.

Teams and drivers

Results and standings

Drivers' championship

Manufacturers' championship

FIA Teams' Cup

Production World Rally Championship

FIA 2 Litre World Cup for Manufacturers
() Denotes dropped score.

(*) – Volkswagen were not classified for not homologating their Golf Kit Car at the start of the season.

Events

External links 

 FIA World Rally Championship 1999 at ewrc-results.com

World Rally Championship
World Rally Championship seasons